Michigan Township may refer to:

Indiana
 Michigan Township, Clinton County, Indiana
 Michigan Township, LaPorte County, Indiana

Kansas
 Michigan Township, Scott County, Kansas, in Scott County, Kansas

Nebraska
 Michigan Township, Valley County, Nebraska

North Dakota
 Michigan Township, Grand Forks County, North Dakota, in Grand Forks County, North Dakota
 Michigan Township, Nelson County, North Dakota, in Nelson County, North Dakota

See also
 List of cities, villages, and townships in Michigan

Township name disambiguation pages